The 1949–50 NBA season was the only season for the Anderson Packers in the National Basketball Association (NBA).

Roster

Regular season

Season standings

Record vs. opponents

Game log

Neutral Games:

November 8 vs St. Louis was played in Richmond, Indiana

November 9 vs Tri-Cities was played in Chicago, Illinois

March 11 vs New York was played in Chicago, Illinois

Playoffs

Western Division Semifinals
(2) Anderson Packers vs. (3) Tri-Cities Blackhawks: Packers win series 2-1
Game 1 @ Anderson (March 21): Anderson 89, Tri-Cities 77
Game 2 @ Tri-Cities (March 23): Tri-Cities 76, Anderson 75
Game 3 @ Anderson (March 24):  Anderson 94, Tri-Cities 71

This was the first playoff meeting between the Packers and Blackhawks.

Western Division Finals
(1) Indianapolis Olympians vs. (2) Anderson Packers: Packers win series 2-1
Game 1 @ Indianapolis (March 28): Indianapolis 77, Anderson 74
Game 2 @ Anderson (March 30): Anderson 84, Indianapolis 67
Game 3 @ Indianapolis (April 1): Anderson 67, Indianapolis 65

This was the first playoff meeting between the Olympians and Packers.

NBA Semifinals
(1) Minneapolis Lakers vs. (2) Anderson Packers: Lakers win series 2-0
Game 1 @ Minneapolis (April 5): Minneapolis 75, Anderson 50
Game 2 @ Anderson (April 6): Minneapolis 90, Anderson 71

This was the first playoff meeting between the Lakers and Packers.

References

Anderson Packers seasons
Anderson